Joshua Hartmann (born 9 June 1999) is a German track and field athlete specializing in sprint events. He competed in the men's 4 × 100 metres relay event at the 2020 Summer Olympics.

Career
In July 2021, Hartmann represented Germany at the 2021 European Athletics U23 Championships in the men's 4 × 100 metres relay where he won a gold medal and set the European under-23 record in the event with a time of 38.70.

Personal life
Hartmann was born in Siegen, Germany to a US-born Ghanaian father and German mother.

References

1999 births
Living people
Sportspeople from Siegen
German male sprinters
German sportspeople of Ghanaian descent
Athletes (track and field) at the 2020 Summer Olympics
Olympic athletes of Germany